Brooklyn Hotel may refer to:

 Brooklyn Hotel (Brooklyn, Iowa) in the United States
 Brooklyn Hotel, The Rocks in Australia
 Brooklyn-Kahle Saddlery Hotel, San Diego, California, dismantled and reassembled as part of the Horton Grand Hotel